Robert Mortimer (16 March 1908 – 26 June 1965) was an English footballer.

Career
Mortimer joined Barrow in 1926, after playing for non-league clubs Connah's Quay & Shotton and Darwen and a non-playing spell with Bolton Wanderers. After making 24 appearances and scoring 10 goals in the league for Barrow, he rejoined Bolton Wanderers in 1928. He again made no league appearances for Wanderers before joining Northampton Town in 1931. He joined Brentford in 1933 after making 62 appearances and scoring 22 goals in the league for Northampton. He made no league appearances for Brentford, and joined Bournemouth & Boscombe Athletic in 1934. He made 18 appearances and scored three goals in the league for Bournemouth, and joined Accrington Stanley in 1935. He made 25 appearances and scored 19 goals in the league for them, and moved to Portsmouth in the same year. He made no league appearances for the club and re-joined Accrington in 1936. During this spell with the club, he made 45 appearances and scored 39 goals in the league before, until eventually joining Blackburn Rovers in 1937 for a four-figure fee. He made 16 appearances and scored four goals in the league for Blackburn before joining York City in the summer of 1938, which was reportedly their biggest fee. He was York City's top scorer for the 1938–39 season, with 22 goals. He made 36 appearances and scored 22 goals for the club before joining Horwich RMI.

References

1908 births
1965 deaths
Footballers from Bolton
English footballers
Association football forwards
Bolton Wanderers F.C. players
Connah's Quay & Shotton F.C. players
Darwen F.C. players
Barrow A.F.C. players
Northampton Town F.C. players
Brentford F.C. players
AFC Bournemouth players
Accrington Stanley F.C. (1891) players
Portsmouth F.C. players
Blackburn Rovers F.C. players
York City F.C. players
Bacup Borough F.C. players
Leigh Genesis F.C. players
English Football League players